Richard John Gorecki (born August 27, 1973) is a former pitcher in Major League Baseball.

Gorecki was drafted by the Los Angeles Dodgers in the 19th round of the 1991 Major League Baseball Draft.  He was selected by the Tampa Bay Devil Rays in the 1997 Major League Baseball expansion draft.

External links

1973 births
Living people
Baseball players from Illinois
Los Angeles Dodgers players
Tampa Bay Devil Rays players
Major League Baseball pitchers
Great Falls Dodgers players
Bakersfield Dodgers players
San Antonio Missions players
Albuquerque Dukes players
Vero Beach Dodgers players
San Bernardino Stampede players
St. Petersburg Devil Rays players
Gulf Coast Devil Rays players
People from Evergreen Park, Illinois
American people of Polish descent